Locust is a small rural city in Stanly and Cabarrus counties in the U.S. state of North Carolina. The population was 2,930 at the 2010 census.

Geography
Locust is located in southwestern Stanly County at  (35.267185, -80.426805). Through annexations, the city limits now extend west into Cabarrus County. Locust is bordered by the town of Stanfield to the south.

The center of Locust is at the intersection of combined North Carolina Highway 24/27 with North Carolina Highway 200. NC 24/27 leads east  to Albemarle and west to the Charlotte area.

Demographics

2020 census

As of the 2020 United States census, there were 4,537 people, 1,397 households, and 956 families residing in the city.

2000 census
As of the census of 2000, there were 2,416 people, 922 households, and 712 families residing in the city. The population density was 470.5 people per square mile (181.5/km2). There were 981 housing units at an average density of 191.0 per square mile (73.7/km2). The racial makeup of the city was 94.91% White, 1.53% African American, 0.46% Native American, 0.17% Asian, 2.03% from other races, and 0.91% from two or more races. Hispanic or Latino of any race were 3.39% of the population.

There were 922 households, out of which 35.2% had children under the age of 18 living with them, 65.9% were married couples living together, 7.9% had a female householder with no husband present, and 22.7% were non-families. 20.4% of all households were made up of individuals, and 8.2% had someone living alone who was 65 years of age or older. The average household size was 2.62 and the average family size was 3.02.

In the city, the population was spread out, with 26.2% under the age of 18, 6.7% from 18 to 24, 32.8% from 25 to 44, 22.8% from 45 to 64, and 11.5% who were 65 years of age or older. The median age was 36 years. For every 100 females, there were 100.3 males. For every 100 females age 18 and over, there were 97.3 males.

The median income for a household in the city was $44,556, and the median income for a family was $50,987. Males had a median income of $35,614 versus $21,375 for females. The per capita income for the city was $19,250. About 3.2% of families and 4.1% of the population were below the poverty line, including 6.9% of those under age 18 and 2.5% of those age 65 or over.

The area is served by The Weekly Post, a weekly newspaper.

Notable person
Adeem the Artist, country music singer

References

External links
 City of Locust official website

Cities in Cabarrus County, North Carolina
Cities in Stanly County, North Carolina
Cities in North Carolina